Julie Benz (born May 1, 1972) is an American actress. She is known for her roles as Darla on Buffy the Vampire Slayer and Angel (1997–2004), and as Rita Bennett on Dexter (2006–2010), for which she won the 2006 Satellite Award for Best Supporting Actress and the 2009 Saturn Award for Best Supporting Actress.

Benz has also starred in the television series Roswell (1999–2000), Desperate Housewives (2010), No Ordinary Family (2010–2011), A Gifted Man (2011–2012), Defiance (2013–2015), Hawaii Five-0 (2015–2017), Training Day (2017) and Love, Victor (2021).

Her film credits include Jawbreaker (1999), The Brothers (2001), Rambo (2008), Saw V (2008), Punisher: War Zone (2008), and The Boondock Saints II: All Saints Day (2009).

Early life
Benz was born in Pittsburgh, Pennsylvania, grew up in Murrysville, and graduated from Franklin Regional High School. Her mother, Joanne Marie (née Seemiller), was a figure skater, and her father, George Benz, Jr., is a surgeon in Pittsburgh. The family settled in nearby Murrysville when Benz was two, and she started ice skating when she was three. She competed in the 1988 U.S. Championships in junior ice dancing with her skating partner David Schilling, and finished in 13th place. When Benz was 14, she suffered a stress fracture in her right leg and had to take time off.

Career
At age 15, Benz was told by an acting coach that she would never succeed as an actress. According to Benz, "I remember the teacher telling me I should not even try acting. I still have the report card where she was like, 'You will never be an actor. Your voice is horrible.' That was the best thing that ever happened to me because I was like, 'I'll show you'." By 1989, with her figure skating career over, Benz became involved in local theater and was cast in the play Street Law. Her first film role was a small speaking part in "The Black Cat" segment of the Dario Argento/George A. Romero horror film Two Evil Eyes (1990). A year later, she was cast in the TV show Hi Honey, I'm Home! (1991), which was cancelled after two seasons.

After graduating from high school in 1990, Benz studied acting at New York University. After graduating from NYU in 1993, she moved to Los Angeles. Two weeks after her move, she obtained a bit part in a 1994 episode of Married... with Children, playing a girl who wanted to lose her virginity to Bud Bundy. Her subsequent roles included an unaired Aaron Spelling television pilot Crosstown Traffic. She starred in another unaired TV pilot called Empire in 1995. Her other TV shows included Hang Time, High Tide, Step by Step, and Boy Meets World, plus a small role in the television film The Barefoot Executive. During the 1990s, her acting career was varied and steady. She had an uncredited role in Black Sheep and her appearance in Diagnosis: Murder as top figure skater "Julie" allowed her to demonstrate her skating talent. Later TV appearances included characters on Sliders and The Single Guy. She played Christy in the television film Hearts Adrift and a lead role as Julie Falcon in Darkdrive.

In 1996, Benz auditioned for the role of Buffy Summers for the television series Buffy the Vampire Slayer, but lost the role to Sarah Michelle Gellar. However, she was offered the small role of the vampire Darla, in the pilot episode. Her performance was so well-received that her part was expanded to a few more episodes.

This role helped launch her career and Julie appeared in guest appearances in more TV shows such as The Big Easy and Fame L.A., along with a small role as a receptionist in the film As Good as It Gets (1997). She starred in the short spoof film Eating Las Vegas and the unaired TV pilot Veronica's Video, had a small uncredited role in the television film A Walton Easter, and a small role in Inventing the Abbotts. In 1998, she had a recurring role as Joplin Russell in the TV show Ask Harriet, then guest starred on both Conrad Bloom and The King of Queens. She made two films, the dark comedy Jawbreaker and Dirt Merchant, before landing a lead role in the TV series Payne, an American remake of the British sitcom Fawlty Towers. It was cancelled after eight episodes had aired.

Benz reprised her role as Darla in 2000 for the Buffy the Vampire Slayer spin-off series Angel, appearing in every season for at least one episode. Julie was a guest host for the TV show Rendez-View, cast as Ellie Sparks in Glory Days and appeared in the unaired pilot; however, she left the show. Later, she guest-starred on She Spies, was in the featured cast for the miniseries Taken, did various voices for the video game Hot Shots Golf Fore!, appeared in the short film The Midget Stays in the Picture, and took over the role of Ursula for George of the Jungle 2.

Benz appeared in Peacemakers, Coupling, NCIS, and Oliver Beene. She landed the lead role of Annie Garrett in the television film The Long Shot and provided the voice of Miranda Keyes for the video game Halo 2, though she did not return to the role in the sequel Halo 3, as Bungie wanted to try a new direction with the Miranda Keyes voice by giving the character an accent. She portrayed Danielle in the direct-to-DVD film Bad Girls from Valley High in 2005. She had a small role in the critically acclaimed television film Lackawanna Blues. In the Sci-Fi Channel original film Locusts: The 8th Plague, she played the lead female role Vicky. She also appeared in the straight-to-DVD film 8mm 2 as Lynn. The film was originally called The Velvet Side of Hell and was not supposed to be a sequel to 8MM. Benz appeared in episodes of Supernatural, CSI: Miami, Law & Order, and CSI: Crime Scene Investigation. She had a supporting role in the Swedish independent film Kill Your Darlings (2006), a lead role in the television film Circle of Friends (2006), and joined the cast of the TV show Dexter as Rita Bennett, Dexter Morgan's girlfriend and eventual wife. Benz played a lead role in the fifth film of the popular Saw horror franchise, Saw V, as Brit, a real estate developer who is one of Jigsaw's five victims. Benz had a supporting role in Punisher: War Zone as Angela and co-starred with Sylvester Stallone in Rambo (2008), the fourth film of the series.

She played the title role in the short film Kidnapping Caitlynn, written by her close friend Jenny Mollen, which premiered at the Vail Film Festival 2009 and was released online April 6, 2009. She starred in the television film Held Hostage as Michelle Estey. in July. She also starred in the television film Uncorked (2009) as Johnny Prentiss which premiered in the UK in July 2009. She is the lead female character Special Agent Eunice Bloom in The Boondock Saints II: All Saints Day which had a limited release on October 30, 2009, and was released on DVD March 9, 2010. She has been cast in another indie film called Bedrooms as Anna. She played Frankie in the 2011 film Answers to Nothing.

Benz appeared on The Soup with Joel McHale. Benz next took a recurring role on Desperate Housewives as Robin Gallagher, a stripper with a heart of gold and a master's degree in education who gets offered the chance to transition into a more legitimate career. The character of Robin is further developed when the audience discovers she is a lesbian and begins an affair with housewife Katherine Mayfair (Dana Delany). After the fourth season finale of Dexter, in which her character is murdered, Benz returned for the fifth-season premiere in a flashback scene.

In early 2010, ABC announced that Benz had landed a lead role as Stephanie Powell in the network's drama pilot No Ordinary Family. Production of the series commenced the following May and it premiered on September 28, 2010, as part of the 2010–11 season. On May 13, 2011, No Ordinary Family was cancelled after one season with only 20 episodes filmed. In 2011, she was cast in the new CBS TV show A Gifted Man. Originally a co-star, she was later downgraded to a recurring role. A Gifted Man was cancelled by CBS in May 2012 after one season of 16 episodes. She was cast in the television film Ricochet as Elise Laird. Benz played the lead female role, Mayor Amanda Rosewater, in the science fiction series Defiance and also starred in the film Supremacy and the unaired TV pilot Middle Ages.

In 2015, Benz landed a recurring role in the CBS series Hawaii Five-O, playing the latest team member and Chin Ho's girlfriend, Abby Dunn. She also starred in the television film Charming Christmas.

In 2021, she starred in the acclaimed TV series Love, Victor.

Personal life
Benz married actor John Kassir on May 30, 1998. She filed for divorce in December 2007.

In 2011, she became engaged to Rich Orosco, and they married on May 5, 2012.

Filmography

Film

Television

Video games

References

External links

 
 
 
 

Actresses from Pittsburgh
American female ice dancers
American film actresses
American television actresses
American voice actresses
Living people
Tisch School of the Arts alumni
People from Murrysville, Pennsylvania
20th-century American actresses
21st-century American actresses
1972 births